Evan Jacob Kruczynski (born March 31, 1995) is an American professional baseball pitcher for the Lake Country DockHounds of the American Association of Professional Baseball.

Amateur career
Kruczynski attended Franklin High School in Franklin, Wisconsin. He helped Franklin win baseball state championships as a freshman in 2010 and a sophomore in 2011. As a junior in 2012, he was 4–4 with a 1.97 ERA, striking out 73 batters in  innings pitched. Undrafted out of high school, he enrolled at East Carolina University where he played college baseball for the East Carolina Pirates.

Kruczynski made only three appearances as a freshman in 2014, but in 2015, as a sophomore, led the team with 16 starts in which he posted an 8–4 record with a 3.17 ERA. As a junior in 2016, he pitched to an 8–1 record with a 2.01 ERA in 17 starts. In 2017, as a senior for the Pirates, he suffered a broken leg and only made ten starts in which he compiled a 4–3 record with a 4.47 ERA. After the season, he was drafted by the St. Louis Cardinals in the ninth round of the 2017 MLB draft. He signed for $3,000.

Professional career

St. Louis Cardinals organization
After signing, Kruczynski made his professional debut with the Peoria Chiefs. He spent the remainder of the year with Peoria, going 4–3 with a 3.41 ERA in 14 games (13 starts). He began 2018 with the Palm Beach Cardinals, with whom he was named a Florida State League All-Star, and was promoted to the Springfield Cardinals in July. In 21 total starts between the two teams, he was 7–6 with a 3.50 ERA and a 1.14 WHIP. He was assigned to play for the Surprise Saguaros of the Arizona Fall League after the season.

Kruczynski began 2019 back with Springfield, and he was promoted to the Memphis Redbirds in May. He was reassigned back to Springfield in June, and finished the season there. Over 28 games (26 starts) between the two clubs, he pitched to a 4–10 record with a 6.09 ERA, striking out 146 over  innings. He did not play a minor league game in 2020 due to the cancellation of the minor league season caused by the COVID-19 pandemic. He returned to Memphis to begin the 2021 season, but pitched only  innings due to injury, going 2-0 with a 6.38 ERA and 22 strikeouts. On March 25, 2022, Kruczynski was released by the Cardinals organization.

Lake Country DockHounds
On March 31, 2022, Kruczynski signed with the Lake Country DockHounds of the American Association of Professional Baseball.

References

External links

1995 births

Living people